James Rogers, VC (4 July 1873 – 28 October 1961) was an Australian recipient of the Victoria Cross, the highest award for gallantry in the face of the enemy that can be awarded to British and Commonwealth forces. Rogers received his award for his actions at Thaba 'Nchu in Orange Free State on 15 June 1901 while serving in the South African Constabulary during the Second Boer War.

Early life
James Rogers was born on 4 July 1873 in Moama, New South Wales, the son of John Rogers, a Welsh-born farmer, and his wife Sarah Louisa, née Johnstone, from Sydney. In 1886 his family moved to Heywood, Victoria, where he worked on his father's farm.

Military service
Rogers joined a local company of the Victorian Mounted Rifles in 1898. Following the outbreak of the Second Boer War he enlisted as a private in the 1st Victorian Mounted Infantry Company. He subsequently arrived at Cape Town in South Africa in November 1899, where his contingent was allocated to a composite Australian regiment which served in the Cape Colony and Orange River. In May 1900 he was seconded to the Provincial Mounted Police in Orange River Colony as a corporal. Rogers subsequently remained in South Africa at the conclusion of his period of service, joining the South African Constabulary. He was 26 years old, and a sergeant in the South African Constabulary, South African Forces when the following deed took place for which he was awarded the Victoria Cross.

After returning to Australia in late 1901 Rogers was commissioned as a lieutenant in the 6th Battalion, Australian Commonwealth Horse, and embarked for South Africa again on 19 May 1902. Following the conclusion of the war his battalion returned to Australia, and he received his Victoria Cross from the acting governor-general, Lord Tennyson, on 18 September 1902 at Government House, Melbourne. He had previously been mentioned in dispatches. Rogers then unsuccessfully sought to obtain a commission in the Australian Military Forces and, after buying and selling a property near Yea, Victoria, returned to South Africa where he worked as detective with the Cape Police until February 1904. On 25 April 1907, Rogers married Ethel Maud Seldon at Portland, Victoria and they later had two sons.

Following the outbreak of the First World War, Rogers was appointed as a lieutenant with the 3rd Light Horse Brigade Train, Australian Army Service Corps. He was wounded at Anzac Cove on Gallipoli on 4 August 1915, and after recovering in hospital in Egypt later served in the Anzac Provost Corps before being returned to Australia for medical reasons in June 1916. Although his appointment in the Australian Imperial Force was terminated on 31 December 1916, he continued to serve on home duties as a captain until the end of the conflict. He subsequently transferred to the reserves on 1 June 1922.

Later life
Rogers later worked as a grazier, running a property in the Mallee district in Victoria, before moving to Kew in Melbourne where he lived for 30 years. While living in Kew he had a series of accidents including a fall in his garden resulting in a broken leg for which he was treated at the Heidelberg Repatriation Hospital. He later sprained his ankle. Rogers was treated at the Repatriation Commission Outpatient Clinic with physio-therapy on 9 April 1948 for an old wound he sustained to his back.

Following the death of his wife he moved to Roseville in Sydney. He died on 28 October 1961, in Concord Repatriation Hospital, Sydney. He was buried in Springvale Cemetery, Victoria. His Victoria Cross is displayed at the Australian War Memorial, Canberra.

Honours and awards

Notes

References

External links
 Staunton, Anthony, Sgt James Rogers VC, A Paper Presented to the 2000 Biennial Seminar of the Military Historical Society of Australia, 9–12 June 2000.

1873 births
1961 deaths
People from Victoria (Australia)
Australian recipients of the Victoria Cross
Second Boer War recipients of the Victoria Cross
Australian military personnel of World War I
Australian Army officers
Military personnel from New South Wales
People from New South Wales